Birth of the Cool is a compilation album by American jazz trumpeter and bandleader Miles Davis, released in February 1957 by Capitol Records. It compiles eleven tracks recorded by Davis's nonet for the label over the course of three sessions during 1949 and 1950.

Featuring unusual instrumentation and several notable musicians, the music consisted of innovative arrangements influenced by classical music techniques such as polyphony, and marked a major development in post-bebop jazz. As the title suggests, these recordings are considered seminal in the history of cool jazz. Most of them were originally released in the 10-inch 78-rpm format and are all approximately three minutes long.

Background 

From 1944 to 1948, Miles Davis played in Charlie Parker's quintet. Davis recorded several albums worth of material with Parker during this period, including Parker's Sessions for the Savoy and Dial labels. Davis' first records released under his own name were recorded with Parker's band, in 1947, and were more arranged and rehearsed than Parker's usual approach to recording. By 1948, Davis had three years of bebop playing under his belt, but he struggled to match the speed and ranges of the likes of Gillespie and Parker, choosing instead to play in the mid range of his instrument. In 1948, Davis, becoming increasingly concerned about growing tensions within the Parker quintet, left the group and began looking for a new band to work with.
	
At the same time, arranger Gil Evans began hosting gatherings of like-minded, forward-looking musicians at his small basement apartment, located on 55th Street in Manhattan, three blocks away from the jazz nightclubs of 52nd Street. Evans had gained a reputation in the jazz world for his orchestration of bebop tunes for the Claude Thornhill orchestra in the mid-1940s. Keeping an open door policy, Evans' apartment came to host many of the young jazz artists of late-1940s New York. The participants engaged in discussions about the future of jazz, including a proposed group with a new sound. According to jazz historian Ted Gioia: 
[The participants] were developing a range of tools that would change the sound of contemporary music. In their work together, they relied on a rich palette of harmonies, many of them drawn from European impressionist composers. They explored new instrumental textures, preferring to blend the voices of the horns like a choir rather than pit them against each other as the big bands had traditionally done with their thrusting and parrying sections. They brought down the tempos of their music ... they adopted a more lyrical approach to improvisation ...

Recording 

The nonet recorded twelve tracks for Capitol during three sessions over the course of nearly a year and a half. Davis, Lee Konitz, Gerry Mulligan and John Barber were the only musicians who played on all three sessions, though the instrumental lineup was constant (excepting the omission of piano on a few songs and the addition of Kenny Hagood on "Darn That Dream").  The first session occurred on January 21, 1949, recording four tracks: Mulligan's "Jeru" and "Godchild" as well as Lewis's "Move" and "Budo".  Jazz critic Richard Cook hypothesizes that Capitol, wanting to get a good start, recorded these numbers first because they were the most catchy tunes in the nonet's small repertoire. That date Kai Winding replaced Zwerin on trombone, Al Haig replaced Lewis on piano, and Joe Shulman replaced McKibbon on bass.

The second recording date came three months later on April 22, 1949 with Davis filling in for Fats Navarro in Tadd Dameron's band with Charlie Parker during the interim. The band returned to the studio with five substitutions in personnel: J. J. Johnson on trombone, Sandy Siegelstein on French horn, Nelson Boyd on bass, and Kenny Clarke on drums, and John Lewis returning to piano. At this session, the nonet recorded Mulligan's "Venus de Milo", Lewis's "Rouge", Carisi's "Israel", and "Boplicity", a collaboration between Davis and Evans, credited to the pseudonym "Cleo Henry".

The band did not return to the studio again until March 9, 1950. Davis did not call the band for any rehearsals or live performances between the second and third recording dates. The March 1950 date featured Mulligan's "Darn That Dream", "Rocker", and "Deception", and Evans's arrangement of Chummy MacGregor's "Moon Dreams", which had been released in a jazz arrangement by Glenn Miller and the AAF Band in 1944 on V-Disc. The band saw more substitutions, with Gunther Schuller on French horn and Al McKibbon on bass. Hagood returned for vocals on "Darn That Dream".

Composition

Music and style 
One of the features of the Davis Nonet was the use of paired instrumentation. An example of this can be heard on the John Lewis arrangement "Move". In "Move", Lewis gives the melody to the pairing of trumpet and alto saxophone, baritone saxophone and tuba supply counterpoint, and trombone and French horn provide harmonies. Gerry Mulligan's "Jeru" demonstrates another Nonet hallmark: the use of a unison sound and rich harmony throughout the horns. Davis said, "I wanted the instruments to sound  like human voices singing ... and they did." Though the album is seen as a departure from traditional bop, the recordings do feature tunes that are considered close to the bop style, such as "Budo" which has the band bookending solos by Davis, Mulligan, Konitz, and Winding, similar to a bebop head arrangement.

Thornhill's influence 
One of the largest stated influences on the sound of The Birth of the Cool was band leader Claude Thornhill and his orchestra. Out of Thornhill's band came Lee Konitz, Gerry Mulligan, and Gil Evans, Miles Davis calling the Konitz-Mulligan-Evans incarnation "the greatest band", second only to "the Billy Eckstine band with Bird." The Thornhill band was known for its impressionistic style, innovative use of instrumentation, such as the use of tuba and French horn, and a non-vibrato playing style, hallmarks that the Miles Davis Nonet adopted for The Birth of the Cool. According to Evans: Miles had liked some of what Gerry and I had written for Claude. The instrumentation for the Miles session was caused by the fact that this was the smallest number of instruments that could get the sound and still express all the harmonies the Thornhill band used. Miles wanted to play his idiom with that kind of sound.
Davis saw the full 18-piece Thornhill orchestra as cumbersome and thus decided to split the group in half for his desired sound. As arrangers, both Evans and Mulligan gave Thornhill credit for crafting their sound. Thornhill's band gave Evans the opportunity to try his hand at arranging small-group bebop tunes for big band, a practice few others were participating in. Mulligan recalls Thornhill teaching him "the greatest lesson in dynamics, the art of underblowing." Thornhill has also been credited with launching the move away from call and response between sections and the move towards unison harmonies.

Release history 

The four tracks from the January 1949 session were released soon after recording as two singles. From the April 1949 date, "Israel" and "Boplicity" were doubled together on a 78 and released as well. Of the twelve tracks recorded, Capitol released relatively few. In 1954, after persuasion from Rugolo, Capitol released eight of the tracks on a 10" LP record titled Classics in Jazz—Miles Davis (H-459). In 1957 eleven of the tracks (all except for "Darn That Dream") were released by Capitol as Birth of the Cool. The final track, "Darn That Dream" (the only song with vocals, by Hagood), was included with the other eleven on a 1972 LP Capitol Jazz Classics, Vol. 1: The Complete Birth Of The Cool (M-11026). Subsequent releases have been based on this last compilation. The album has since been reissued many times in various formats. The live recordings of the nonet from its time at the Royal Roost were released as Cool Boppin. In 1998, Capitol Records released The Complete Birth of the Cool, which was remastered by Mark Levinson and collected the nonet's live and studio tracks onto a single CD.

Note from the 2000 Capitol CD reissue producer Michael Cuscuna:

Reception and aftermath 

The band's debut performance at the Royal Roost received positive, but reserved reactions. Count Basie, the Roost's headliner during the Nonet's brief tenure, however, was more open to the group's sound, saying, "Those slow things sounded strange and good. I didn't always know what they were doing, but I listened, and I liked it." Winthrop Sargeant, classical music critic at The New Yorker, compared the band's sound to the work of an "impressionist composer with a great sense of aural poetry and a very fastidious feeling for tone color... The music sounds more like that of a new Maurice Ravel than it does like jazz ... it is not really jazz." Though he did not recognize the record as jazz, Sargeant acknowledged that he found the record "charming and exciting". 
In the short term the reaction to the band was little to none, but in the long term the recordings' effects have been great and lasting. They have been credited with starting the cool jazz movement as well as creating a new and viable alternative to bebop.

In 1957, after the release of Birth of the Cool, Down Beat magazine wrote that the album "[influenced] deeply one important direction of modern chamber jazz." Several tunes from the album, such as Carisi's "Israel", have gone on to become jazz standards.  The album was included in the book 1001 Albums You Must Hear Before You Die. Birth of the Cool was voted number 349 in Colin Larkin's All Time Top 1000 Albums 3rd Edition (2000).

Many members of the Miles Davis Nonet went on to have successful careers in cool jazz, notably Gerry Mulligan, John Lewis, and Lee Konitz. Mulligan moved to California and joined forces with trumpeter Chet Baker in a piano-less quartet, before creating his Concert Jazz Band. Lewis would become music director of the Modern Jazz Quartet, which would become one of the most influential cool jazz groups. Evans would go on to collaborate with Davis again on the Davis albums Miles Ahead and Sketches of Spain. Capitol Records were at the time disappointed with the sales of the nonet recordings, and did not offer Davis a contract extension. Instead, Davis signed with the new jazz specialty record label, Prestige, for whom he would record his first album in 1951.

Track listings 
Arrangements by the composer unless otherwise noted.

Birth of the Cool (1957 12" LP, Capitol T-762) 
Side A
 (1) "Move" (Denzil Best, arranged by John Lewis) – 2:29
 (2) "Jeru" (Gerry Mulligan) – 3:10
 (3) "Moon Dreams" (Chummy MacGregor, Johnny Mercer, arranged by Gil Evans) – 3:13
 (4) "Venus De Milo" (Mulligan) – 3:10
 (5) "Budo" (Miles Davis, Bud Powell, arranged by John Lewis) – 2:31
 (6) "Deception" (George Shearing, Davis, arranged by Gerry Mulligan) – 2:46

Side B
 (7) "Godchild" (George Wallington, arranged by Gerry Mulligan) – 3:08
 (8) "Boplicity" (Cleo Henry a.k.a. Davis and Gil Evans, arranged by Gil Evans) – 2:58
 (9) "Rocker" (Mulligan) – 3:04
 (10) "Israel" (Johnny Carisi) – 2:15
 (11) "Rouge" (John Lewis) – 3:13

Recording dates
 Tracks  1, 2, 5, 7 on January 21, 1949
 Tracks  4, 8, 10, 11 on April 22, 1949
 Tracks  3, 6, 9 on March 9, 1950

Recorded at WOR Studios, New York, New York.

Birth of the Cool (1989 CD, Capitol) 
 "Move" (Denzil Best, arranged by John Lewis) – 2:32
 "Jeru" (Gerry Mulligan) – 3:10
 "Moon Dreams" (Chummy MacGregor, Johnny Mercer, arranged by Gil Evans) – 3:17
 "Venus de Milo" (Mulligan) – 3:10
 "Budo" (Miles Davis, Bud Powell, arranged by Lewis) – 2:32
 "Deception" (Davis, arranged by Mulligan) – 2:45
 "Godchild" (George Wallington, arranged by Mulligan) – 3:07
 "Boplicity" (Cleo Henry (i.e. Davis and Gil Evans), arranged by Evans) – 2:59
 "Rocker" (Mulligan) – 3:03
 "Israel" (Johnny Carisi) – 2:15
 "Rouge" (John Lewis) – 3:13
 "Darn That Dream" (Eddie DeLange, Jimmy Van Heusen, arranged by Mulligan) – 3:26

Recording dates
 Tracks 1, 2, 5, 7 on January 21, 1949
 Tracks 4, 8, 10, 11 on April 22, 1949
 Tracks 3, 6, 9, 12 on March 9, 1950

Recorded at WOR Studios, New York, New York.

The Complete Birth of the Cool (1998 CD, Capitol)

The Studio Sessions 
 "Move" (Denzil Best, arranged by John Lewis) – 2:32
 "Jeru" (Gerry Mulligan) – 3:10
 "Moon Dreams" (Chummy MacGregor, Johnny Mercer, arranged by Gil Evans) – 3:17
 "Venus de Milo" (Mulligan) – 3:10
 "Budo" (Miles Davis, Bud Powell, arranged by Mulligan) – 2:32
 "Deception" (Davis, arranged by Mulligan) – 2:45
 "Godchild" (George Wallington, arranged by Mulligan) – 3:07
 "Boplicity" (Cleo Henry (i.e. Davis and Gil Evans), arranged by Evans) – 2:59
 "Rocker" (Mulligan) – 3:03
 "Israel" (Johnny Carisi) – 2:15
 "Rouge" (John Lewis) – 3:13
 "Darn That Dream" (Eddie DeLange, Jimmy Van Heusen, arranged by Mulligan) – 3:26

Recording dates
 Tracks 1, 2, 5, 7 on January 21, 1949
 Tracks 4, 8, 10, 11 on April 22, 1949
 Tracks 3, 6, 9, 12 on March 9, 1950

Recorded at WOR Studios, New York, New York.

The Live Sessions 

Recording dates
 Tracks 13-21 on September 4, 1948
 Tracks 22-25 on September 18, 1948

Recorded live at Royal Roost in New York for WMCA radio broadcast.

Personnel 

January 21, 1949 – "Jeru", "Move", "Godchild", "Budo" (matrix numbers: 3395, 3396, 3397, 3398)

 Miles Davis – trumpet
 Kai Winding – trombone
 Junior Collins – French horn
 Bill Barber – tuba
 Lee Konitz – alto saxophone
 Gerry Mulligan – baritone saxophone
 Al Haig – piano
 Joe Shulman – bass
 Max Roach – drums

April 22, 1949 – "Venus De Milo", "Rouge", "Boplicity", "Israel" (matrix numbers: 3764, 3765, 3766, 3767)
 Miles Davis – trumpet
 J. J. Johnson – trombone
 Sandy Siegelstein – French horn
 Bill Barber – tuba
 Lee Konitz – alto saxophone
 Gerry Mulligan – baritone saxophone
 John Lewis – piano
 Nelson Boyd – bass
 Kenny Clarke – drums

March 9, 1950 – "Deception", "Rocker", "Moon Dreams", "Darn That Dream" (matrix numbers: 4346, 4347, 4348, 4349)

 Miles Davis – trumpet
 J. J. Johnson – trombone
 Gunther Schuller – French horn
 Bill Barber – tuba
 Lee Konitz – alto saxophone
 Gerry Mulligan – baritone saxophone
 John Lewis – piano
 Al McKibbon – bass
 Max Roach – drums
 Kenny Hagood – vocal (on "Darn That Dream" only)

All tracks recorded at WOR Studios, New York, New York

The Complete Birth of the Cool: The Live Sessions
 Miles Davis – trumpet
 Mike Zwerin – trombone
 Junior Collins – French horn
 Bill Barber – tuba
 Lee Konitz – alto saxophone
 Gerry Mulligan – baritone saxophone
 John Lewis – piano
 Al McKibbon – bass
 Max Roach – drums
 Kenny Hagood – vocal  (on "Why Do I Love You?" and "Darn That Dream" only)

Certifications and sales

Notes

References 

Sources
 Berrett, Joshua and Louis G. Bourgois. The Musical World of J.J. Johnson. Scarecrow Press, 1999. .
 Chambers, Jack. Milestones 1: The Music and Times of Miles Davis to 1960. New York: Beach Tree Books, 1983. .
 Cook, Richard. It's About That Time: Miles Davis On and Off Record. New York: Oxford University Press, 2005. .
 Crease, Stephanie. "Gil Evans: Forever Cool." Down Beat, May 2012. p. 33-35.
 Davis, Miles. Miles Davis-Birth of the Cool: Scores from the Original Parts. Ed. Jeff B. Sultanof. Milwaukee, WI.: Hal Leonard Corporation, 2002. .
 Fordham, John. "50 Great Moments in Jazz: Birth of the Cool", The Guardian. Posted November 2, 2009. Retrieved April 24, 2012.
 Gioia, Ted. The History of Jazz. New York: Oxford University Press, 1997. .
 Gioia, Ted. "Miles Davis's Memorable Nonet." Jazz.com. Posted September 3, 2008.
 Gioia, Ted. The Birth (and Death) of the Cool. Golden, Colo.: Speck Press, 2009. .
 Gridley, Mark C. Jazz Styles. Tenth Edition. Prentice Hall, 2009.
 Hamilton, Andy. Lee Konitz, Conversations on the Improviser's Art. Ann Arbor, Mich.: The University of Michigan Press, 2007. .
 Hentoff, Nat. "The Birth of the Cool." Down Beat, May 2, 1957: 15–16. Print.
 Kernfeld, Barry. "Miles Davis." Grove Music Online. Web. Apr 24, 2012.
 Klinkowitz, Jerome. Listen: Gerry Mulligan. An Aural Narrative in Jazz. New York: Schirmer Books, 1991. .
 Sultanof, Jeff. "The Dozens: The Birth of the Cool." Jazz.com. (No date, prbl. 1998).

Further reading 
 Davis, Miles; Troupe, Quincy, Miles, the autobiography, Simon and Schuster, 1990. . Cf. pp.117–118

External links 
 

1949 in American music
1950 in American music
1957 compilation albums
Albums produced by Pete Rugolo
Capitol Records compilation albums
Cool jazz albums
Grammy Hall of Fame Award recipients
Miles Davis compilation albums